Ivanti is an IT software company headquartered in South Jordan, Utah, United States. It produces software for IT Security, IT Service Management, IT Asset Management, Unified Endpoint Management, Identity Management and supply chain management. It was formed in January 2017 with the merger of LANDESK and HEAT Software, and later acquired Cherwell Software.

History

LANDESK
LAN Systems was founded in 1985 and its software products acquired by Intel in 1991 to form its LANDESK division. LANDESK introduced the desktop management category in 1993. In 2002 LANDESK Software became a standalone company with headquarters near Salt Lake City, Utah. In 2006, Avocent purchased the company for $416 million. Also in 2006, LANDESK added process management technologies to its product line and extended into the consolidated service desk market with LANDESK Service Desk. In 2010 LANDESK was acquired by private equity firm Thoma Bravo.

LANDESK bought supply chain software company Wavelink in 2012, network vulnerability assessment and patch management company Shavlik in 2013, application software company Naurtech Corporation in 2014, data visualisation company Xtraction Solutions in 2015. and AppSense, a provider of secure user environment management technology, in 2016.

Lumension Security
Lumension Security, Inc was founded as High Tech Software in 1991 and headquartered in Scottsdale, Arizona The company was rebranded as PatchLink Corporation in 1999. In 2016, Patrick Clawson was appointed chairman, CEO and president The company then adopted the Lumension name in 2007.

In 2009 Lumension acquired Securityworks, and in 2012 acquired CoreTrace.

Through this period, industry awards included:
 In 2014, "Lumension Endpoint Management and Security Suite" was "Highly Commended" in the Best Advanced Persistent Threat Protection category at the SC Magazine Awards Europe 2014.
 In 2013, Lumension received the position as a "Visionary" on Gartner's Magic Quadrant for Endpoint Protection Platforms.
 In 2012, 2011 and 2010 Lumension received the position as a "Visionary" on Gartner's Magic Quadrant for Endpoint Protection Platforms.
 In 2011 "Lumension Power Management" was listed in the Manitoba Hydro Commercial Network Energy Management Program.
 In 2010 Lumension was named a "Leader" in Vulnerability Management in the Forrester Wave report.
 In 2010 "Lumension Risk Manager" was "Highly Commended" in the Best Security Management category at the SC Magazine Awards Europe 2010.
 In 2008 Frost & Sullivan awarded Lumension the Global Market Penetration Leadership Award.

Lumension products traditionally competed in the endpoint management and security industry against Sophos, McAfee, Kaspersky Lab, Symantec and Trend Micro among others.

HEAT
HEAT software was a producer of software for IT Service Management and Endpoint Management formed in 2015 by the merger of FrontRange Solutions and Lumension Security.

Ivanti
In January 2017 Clearlake Capital, owner of HEAT Software, purchased LANDESK from Thoma Bravo. On January 23, 2017, LANDESK and HEAT Software merged to form Ivanti. The combined company has 1800 employees in 23 countries and markets some products with references to their original names such as Wavelink supply chain software and Ivanti patch product ‘powered by Shavlik’.

On April 12, 2017, Ivanti acquired Concorde Solutions, a UK based Software Asset Management company. In July 2017, Ivanti acquired RES Software, a US and Netherlands based company producing automation and identity management software.

In September 2020, Ivanti entered into an agreement to acquire US based Unified Endpoint Management company MobileIron for $872 million and San Jose, California based Pulse Secure, for undisclosed terms.
On December 1, 2020, Ivanti announced those acquisitions completed.

On January 26, 2021, Ivanti announced the intent to acquire Cherwell Software.

On August 2, 2021, Ivanti acquired RiskSense, a pioneer in risk-based vulnerability management and prioritization, to drive the next evolution of patch management.

Products 
 Ivanti Neurons hyperautomation platform
 Ivanti Neurons for Discovery
 Ivanti Neurons for Edge Intelligence
 Ivanti Neurons for Healing 
 Ivanti Neurons for Workspace
 Unified Endpoint Management
 Ivanti Neurons for UEM
 Ivanti Neurons for MDM
 Ivanti Endpoint Manager
 Ivanti User Workspace Manager
 Endpoint Security
 Ivanti Neurons for Patch Management
 Ivanti Neurons for RBVM
 Ivanti Neurons for ASOC
 Ivanti Patch for MEM
 Ivanti Mobile Threat Defense
 Ivanti Patch for Endpoint Manager
 Network Security
 Ivanti Connect Secure
 Ivanti Neurons for Secure Access
 Ivanti Policy Secure
 Ivanti Neurons for Zero Trust Access
 Service and Asset Management
 Ivanti Neurons for ITSM
 Ivanti Neurons Digital Assistant
 Ivanti Neurons for HR
 Ivanti Neurons for Facilities
 Ivanti Neurons for GRC
 Ivanti Neurons for PPM
 Ivanti Neurons for Asset Management
 Ivanti Neurons for Spend Intelligence

Controversies

2021 Pulse Connect Secure hack 

On April 20, 2021, cybersecurity firm FireEye reported that hackers with suspected Chinese ties exploited Pulse Secure VPN to break into government agencies, defense companies and financial institutions in Europe and the US. The report detailed how hackers repeatedly took advantage of several known and one novel flaw in Pulse Secure VPN to gain access to dozens of organizations in the defense industrial sector. The US Department of Homeland Security confirmed the intrusions in a public advisory, urging network administrators to scan for signs of compromise. Ivanti published an emergency workaround which DHS urged network admins to install. The Cybersecurity and Infrastructure Security Agency ordered federal civilian agencies to take several steps to reduce risk from the suspected breach. FireEye reported that some of the intrusions using the vulnerabilities began as early as August 2020, conducted by those with suspected ties to the Chinese government. There were similarities between the hack and intrusions in 2014 and 2015 conducted by a Chinese espionage actor named APT5. After further examination, CISA discovered that at least 5 federal agencies had been breached, among 24 agencies that use the Pulse Connect Secure products.

References

Software companies based in Utah
Remote administration software
System administration
Software companies established in 1985
1985 establishments in Utah
Software companies of the United States